Taco Palenque is a Mexican cuisine restaurant chain in South Texas and northern Tamaulipas, Mexico. The restaurant is headquartered in Laredo, Texas and was established in 1987. The restaurant's main dishes are the flame-grilled beef or chicken fajita plate, parrillada, pirata taco, panchos drizzled with bean and cheese on top of tortilla chips, homemade desserts, and breakfast tacos Taco Palenque's salad bar has more than 7 different homemade salsas.

History

Taco Palenque was founded by Juan Francisco Ochoa (Don Pancho) from Sinaloa, Mexico. Ochoa was also the creator of the El Pollo Loco secret chicken recipe and founder of the Grilled chicken concept. Don Pancho Ochoa and his brothers and sisters opened several El Pollo Loco franchises in Mexico in the late 1970s and the United States in the 1980s.

In 1985, Juan Francisco moved to Monterrey where he planned to create a Mexican fastfood chain in the United States with drive thrus that served authentic Mexican food. In 1987, Ochoa opened Taco Palenque in Laredo, Texas. The chain expanded to McAllen in 1998, Brownsville in 2001, San Antonio in 2007, Nuevo Laredo, Mexico in 2008, Houston, Texas in 2010, Mission, Texas, Cotulla, Texas in 2011, Weslaco, Texas in 2015 and, Round Rock, Texas in 2021. In 2005 Palenque grill was established.

Subsidiaries

Palenque Grill
Palenque Grill is a subsidiary of Taco Palenque. Palenque Grill was established in 2005 with the opening of its first restaurant in Laredo. unlike Taco Palenque, Palenque Grill is a casual dining table-service restaurant that features premium ingredients, margaritas, parrilladas, appetizers and desserts. These restaurants are higher-end than the regular Taco Palenque.

A second location was opened in McAllen in 2006. This was followed by the opening of a third location in San Antonio in 2011. A second Laredo location, fourth in the chain, was open in 2016. A fifth location was open in Edinburg in 2019.

The official slogan for Palenque Grill is "Un Rinconcito de Mexico" which means "A little corner of Mexico." A 2012 restaurant review in the San Antonio Express-News gave the Palenque Grill four out of a possible five stars and called the restaurant "a good choice for a visit".

Pollo Palenque
Pollo Palenque (formally named Pollo Tori) is another subsidiary of Taco Palenque. Pollo Palenque is a fast-food restaurant chain specializing in Mexican grilled chicken. The restaurant's main dish is pollo asado, a grilled marinated chicken. The meal is usually served with salsa, totopos and tortillas. The restaurant is currently only located on the border. It is located in Laredo, Texas and the Rio Grande Valley.

See also 
 El Pollo Loco
 List of Mexican restaurants
List of Texas companies (T)

References

External links 
 Taco Palenque Official Page
 Palenque Grill Official Page

Companies based in Laredo, Texas
Restaurants in Texas
Mexican restaurants
Restaurants established in 1987
1987 establishments in Texas